Darragh Rabbitte (born 1980) is an Irish hurler who played as a goalkeeper for the Tipperary senior team.

Rabbiitte joined the team during the 2001 championship and was a member of the team until he left the panel after the 2002 championship. He won a senior All-Ireland winners' medal as a non-playing substitute.

At club level Rabbitte plays with the Borris–Ileigh club.

References

1980 births
Living people
Hurling goalkeepers
Borris-Ileigh hurlers
Tipperary inter-county hurlers